Pale Hands I Loved So Well is the third album by English band Eyeless in Gaza, released in 1982 by record label Uniton.

Reception 

AllMusic called it "arguably the highlight of the band's earliest days" and "a delicate, focused, and impassioned collection that sounds like little else released in the English-speaking world in 1981." An unfavourable review came from Trouser Press, which described it as "fairly dissolute – a meandering, largely improvisational attempt to make music out of aimless doodles".

Track listing
All tracks composed by Martyn Bates and Peter Becker
"Tall and White Nettles"
"Warm Breath, Soft and Slow"
"Blue Distance"
"Sheer Cliffs"
"Falling Leaf/Fading Flower, Goodbye to Summer"
"Lies of Love"
"To Ellen"
"Pale Saints"
"Letters to She"
"Light Sliding"
"Big Clipper Ship"

References

External links 

 

1982 albums
Eyeless in Gaza albums
Experimental music albums by British artists
Albums produced by John A. Rivers